Johor Bahru, Malaysia, has the following notable landmarks.

Famous landmarks

 Sultan Ibrahim Building
 Istana Besar
 Sultan Iskandar Complex or JB CIQ
 Istana Bukit Serene
 Istana Pasir Pelangi
 English College Johore Bahru
 Tan Hiok Nee Heritage Street

Shopping centres
The following lists modern shopping centres in Johor Bahru.

Johor Bahru Central Business District (CBD)

 Johor Bahru City Square
 Located in the Central Business District along the bustling main road Jalan Wong Ah Fook. Completed in 1998, it consists of five storey of shopping mall, a 36-storey office tower and an underground carpark.

 Komtar JBCC
 Also located along Jalan Wong Ah Fook, Kompleks Tun Abdul Razak or KOMTAR is one of the oldest shopping complex in Johor Bahru. Officially opened on March 11, 1979 by the third prime minister of Malaysia, Tun Hussein Onn, KOMTAR consists of a two-storey shopping mall and a 25-storey office tower block. The whole shopping mall area was closed and demolished for rebuilding in 2013 and was renamed Komtar JBCC after completion in 2014.
 Galleria@Kotaraya
 Located along Jalan Trus and next to Johor International Convention Center, it is recently renovated, rebranded and renamed. Before this, it is known as Plaza Kotaraya.

Kota Southkey 

 The Mall, Mid Valley Southkey
 Located at the Kota Southkey along the Eastern Dispersal Link (EDL), one of the largest shopping center in Johor Bahru. Opened for business in 23 April 2019.
 Anchor tenant: Sogo, GSC Cinemas

Stulang 
 The ZON Shopping Mall
 Located at Stulang Laut water front, it consists of a Hotel (ZON Regency), Ferry Terminal and a Duty Free Zone.

Taman Pelangi 

 Pelangi Leisure Mall
 Located along Jalan Serampang, Taman Pelangi. It was opened with the objective of being an entertainment hub, housing a 5 theatre cinema and a bowling alley.
 Anchor tenant: Giant Hypermarket
 Plaza Pelangi
 Located at the junction of Jalan Kuning, Taman Pelangi and the main road Jalan Terbrau. It is considered as an up market shopping mall during its earlier days.
 Anchor tenant: Cold Storage (supermarket)

Taman Sentosa and Taman Abad 

 Plaza Sentosa
 Located along Jalan Sutera, Taman Sentosa. Completed in 1984, it was known as Lien Hoe Complex, changed its name to Plaza Sentosa in 2007 and completed its renovation in 2012.
 Anchor tenant: The Store (Supermarket/Departmental Store)
 Holiday Plaza
 Located along Jalan Dato' Sulaiman, Taman Abad. Completed in 1985, it is a three-storey shopping centre. Prior to the construction of the Johor Bahru City Square, this was the most popular shopping centre. It also has an 18-storey office tower block. Currently well known for its handphone shops and handphone accessories stalls. 
 KSL City
 Located along Jalan Seladang, Taman Abad. Completed in 2010, it is a mixed residential/commercial/hospitality development consisting D'Esplanade Residence, KSL Resort (a 5 Star Hotel) and a shopping mall. It also have an EXPO hall.
 Anchor tenant: Tesco (Hypermart)

Taman Johor Jaya, Taman Sri Tebrau and Plentong 
 Tesco Extra Plentong
 Giant Hypermarket Plentong
 The Store Pandan
 The Store Taman Johor Jaya

Permas Jaya 
 ÆON Permas Jaya
 Permas City

Desa Tebrau

 ÆON Tebrau City Shopping Centre
Once the largest shopping mall owned by ÆON. Located in Taman Desa Tebrau.
Anchor tenant: ÆON
 Tesco Tebrau City
Anchor tenant: Tesco (Hypermart)
 IKEA Tebrau
 The third store in Malaysia and largest IKEA store operated in Southeast Asia. Located at Taman Desa Tebrau, operated since November 2017.

Tampoi

 Angsana Johor Bahru Mall
 Paradigm Mall Johor Bahru
 Operated since November 2017, the largest shopping mall operated in Johor. Famous for exotics and fashionable stuff. Operated by WCT Hartanah Jaya Sdn. Bhd.
 Anchor Tenant: Parkson
 Giant Tampoi

Recreational parks

 Johor Zoo
 Danga Bay
 Hutan Bandar Johor Bahru
 Taman Merdeka

Hospitals

 Government
 Sultanah Aminah Hospital (Johor Bahru General Hospital)
 Sultan Ismail Hospital
 Private
 Medical Specialist Centre
 Siow Specialist Hospital
 Johor Specialist Centre
 Puteri Specialist Hospital
 Columbia Asia Hospital, Tebrau

Places of worship
 Islam

 Masjid Negeri Sultan Abu Bakar
 Masjid An-Nur Kotaraya
 Masjid Diraja Pasir Pelangi
 Masjid Jamek Taman Pelangi
 Masjid Jamek Bandar Baru UDA
 Masjid Jamek Larkin
 Masjid Jamek Nong Chik
 Masjid Ungku Tun Aminah Tampoi
 Masjid Jamek Kampung Melayu Majidee
 Kompleks Islam Johor
 Buddhist
 Santi Forest Monastery (寜心寺)
 Metta Lodge Pusat Buddhist Johor
 Taoist
 Guan Gong temple
 Johor Bahru Old Chinese temple (柔佛古庙) at Jalan Trus
 San Shan Temple (三善宫) at Jalan Yahya Awal
 Zheng Ann Old Temple (新山镇安古庙) at Jalan Stulang Darat
 Hinduism
 Arulmigu Rajamariamman Devasthanam
 Arulmigu Sri Rajakaliamman Glass Temple
 Arulmigu Thendayuthapani Kovil
 Sri Selva Vinayagar Temple
 Kuil Sri Sivan Larkin Jaya
 Christianity

 Roman Catholic
 Church of the Immaculate Conception
 Cathedral of the Sacred Heart of Jesus
 Protestant
 Calvary Charismatic Centre
 Cornerstone Church International
 Full Gospel Church
 Holy Light Presbyterian Church
 Johor Bahru Lutheran Church
 St. Christopher's Anglican Church

Housing estates
 Century Garden
 Taman Johor Jaya
 Taman Molek
 Taman Desa Jaya
 Taman Kempas
 Taman Suria
 Taman Intan
 Taman Desa Cemerlang
 Taman Muhibbah
 Taman Nora
 Taman Gunung Emas
 Puteri Wangsa
 Taman Bukit Tiram
 Taman Tiram Jaya
 Taman Sri Tiram
 Taman Tiram Baru
 Taman Gembira
 Taman Sri
 Taman Kenanga
 Taman Pelangi Indah
 Taman Daya
 Taman Serene Park
 Kim Teng Park
 Taman Pelangi
 Bandar Baru UDA
 Taman Sri Tebrau
 Nusa Damai
 Taman Scientex
 Taman Bukit Dahlia
 Taman Melodies
 Taman Pulai Jaya
 Taman Pulai Utama
 Taman Sri Pulai Perdana
 Taman Teratai
 Taman Pulai Emas
 Bandar Seri Alam
 Taman Dato' Yahya Sahban
 Taman Murni
 Taman Maju Jaya
 Taman Gaya
 Taman Bukit Jaya
 Taman Dato' Chellam
 Taman Plentong Utama
 Taman Plentong Baru
 Taman Ria Plentong
 Taman Sri Plentong
 Taman Perindustrian Plentong
 Taman Perindustrian Sri Plentong
 Taman D'Utama
 Taman Permata
 Taman Timur
 Taman Sri Puteri
 Taman Harmoni
 Taman Tan Sri Yaakob
 Taman Perindustrian JB Perdana
 Bandar Uda Utama
 Taman Ehsan Jaya
 Taman Mewah Jaya
 Taman Impian Emas
 Taman Damansara Aliff
 Taman Tasek
 Taman Pelangi Indah
 Taman Desa Tebrau
 Taman Gaya

Kampung 

 Majidee Malay Village
 Kg. Dato Sulaiman Mentri
 Kg. Bakar Batu
 Kg. Tok Siak
 Kg. Setanggi
 Kg. Bendahara
 Kg. Mohamed Amin
 Kg. Dato Onn

Cemeteries and memorials

 Mahmoodiah Royal Mausoleum
 Tanjung Kupang Memorial

References

Johor Bahru
Buildings and structures in Johor
Tourist attractions in Johor